Big River is the third studio album by Australian country music artist Troy Cassar-Daley. It was released in August 1999 and peaked at number 49 on the ARIA Charts.  The name of the album was in memory of the area of his Grafton home. At the 2000 Australia Country Music Awards, Troy won Best Male Vocal and Song of The Year for "They Don't Make 'Em Like That Anymore".

At the ARIA Music Awards of 2000, the album won the ARIA Award for Best Country Album.

Track listing

Charts

Certifications

Release history

References

1999 albums
ARIA Award-winning albums
Troy Cassar-Daley albums